Wendat is an alternate spelling of Wyandot and Wyandotte, and alternate name for Huron.

Wendat may refer to:

 Wyandot people, the Wendat-Huron peoples
 Wendat language, the language of these peoples
 Wyandot religion

Other uses
 Huron-Wendat village, Quebec, Canada
 Wendat Confederacy, a former nation found around Georgian Bay of Lake Huron, see Wyandot people
 Huron-Wendat Nation, a nation of Huron-Wendat bands found in Quebec, Canada, near Quebec City
 Wyandotte Nation, a nation of Wendat bands in Oklahoma, United States

See also

 
 Huron-Wendat (disambiguation)
 Wyandotte (disambiguation)
 Wyandot (disambiguation)
 Huron (disambiguation)